Adams is a historic community located in Armstrong County, Pennsylvania. It is near the Allegheny River.

Sources
 Platt, William G. (1879). Report of Progress in Armstrong County. 
 Harrisburg, PA: Pennsylvania Geological Survey, 2nd series, H5, lxvill, 388 p. geol map. scale 1 in.=2 mi.
 Adams, Pennsylvania, Geographic Names Information System, U.S. Geological Survey.

Populated places in Armstrong County, Pennsylvania